Poth is a town in Wilson County, Texas, United States. The population was 1,819 at the 2020 census. It is part of the San Antonio metropolitan area.

Geography
According to the United States Census Bureau, the town has a total area of 3.2 square miles (8.3 km), all of it land. This is about 35 mi (56 km) southeast of Downtown San Antonio.

Demographics

As of the 2020 United States census, there were 1,819 people, 504 households, and 433 families residing in the town.

At the 2000 census there were 1,850 people, 623 households, and 490 families in the town. The population density was 579.7 people per square mile (223.9/km). There were 663 housing units at an average density of 207.7 per square mile (80.2/km).  The racial makeup of the town was 66.43% White, 0.43% African American, 0.92% Native American, 0.16% Asian, 29.08% from other races, and 2.97% multiracial.  Hispanic or Latino of any race were 56.65%.

There were 623 households, of which 41.6% had children under the age of 18 living with them, 63.9% were married couples living together, 10.6% had a female head of household with no husband present, and 21.3% were non-families.  Individuals made up 19.6% of all households, and 10.6% were one person aged 65 or older.  The average household size was 2.97 and the average family size was 3.41.

The age distribution was: 31.1% under the age of 18, 9.2% from 18 to 24, 28.9% from 25 to 44, 18.8% from 45 to 64, and 12.1% 65 or older.  The median age was 33 years. For every 100 females, there were 100.4 males.  For every 100 females age 18 and over, there were 92.6 males.

The median household income was $35,492 and the median family income was $42,279. Males had a median income of $30,885 versus $21,563 for females.  The per capita income for the town was $13,910.  About 15.5% of families and 18.1% of the population were below the poverty line, including 20.5% of those under age 18 and 23.3% of those age 65 or over.

The most common occupation for males living in the Poth area is construction, followed by food service, and then occupations in the agricultural industry.  The most common occupational industry for females living in Poth is health care, followed by educational services, and then food services.

Education
The south central Wilson County area is served by the Poth Independent School District, which enrolls students from prekindergarten through twelfth grade.  There is one elementary school, one middle school, and one high school (Poth High School) within Poth ISD.

History
The town was originally named Marcelina when it was established in 1886 for employees of the railway between San Antonio and Aransas Pass, but renamed in 1901 for A. H. Poth, who owned a cotton processing business.

In 1970, the town made national news when almost all of its citizens (more than 1,100 out of 1,296) agreed to be inoculated with the oral polio vaccine when one of the town's children contracted polio.

References

Towns in Wilson County, Texas
Towns in Texas
Greater San Antonio